Zahna-Elster is a town in the district of Wittenberg, in Saxony-Anhalt, Germany. It was formed on 1 January 2011 by the merger of the former municipalities Zahna, Dietrichsdorf, Elster (Elbe), Gadegast, Leetza, Listerfehrda, Mühlanger, Zemnick and Zörnigall. On 29 May 2013 the incorporation of Mühlanger was reverted as a result of a decision of the Constitutional court of Saxony-Anhalt, but it was incorporated again on 1 January 2014. These former municipalities are now the 9 Ortschaften (municipal divisions) of the town Zahna-Elster.

References 

 
Wittenberg (district)